Sonipat Assembly constituency is one of the 90 constituencies in the Haryana Legislative Assembly of Haryana a north state of India. Sonipat is also part of Sonipat Lok Sabha constituency.

Members of Assembly
2009: Kavita Jain, Bharatiya Janata Party
2014: Kavita Jain, Bharatiya Janata Party
2019: Surender Panwar, Indian National Congress

Election Results

2019 results

References

Assembly constituencies of Haryana
Sonipat district